Birdwell Rovers F.C. is an English association football club based in Birdwell, Barnsley, South Yorkshire.

History
The club was formed in the 19th century, and entered the FA Cup on 11 occasions between 1907 and 1928 before folding in 1928.

Honours
Sheffield & Hallamshire Minor Cup League
Champions - 1895–96

Records
Best FA Cup performance: 2nd Qualifying Round, 1921–22 taking Wombwell to a replay before losing 1–0.

References

Defunct football clubs in South Yorkshire
Sheffield Association League
Barnsley Association League
Association football clubs disestablished in 1928
1928 disestablishments in England